Dorothea Kalpakidou (born September 21, 1983 in Serres) is a female Greek discus thrower. Kalpakidou represented Greece at the 2008 Summer Olympics in Beijing, where she competed for the women's discus throw. She placed thirty-fifth in the qualifying rounds with a throw of 53.00 metres, failing to advance into the final.

References

External links

NBC 2008 Olympics profile

Greek female discus throwers
Living people
Olympic athletes of Greece
Athletes (track and field) at the 2008 Summer Olympics
1983 births
Sportspeople from Serres
21st-century Greek women